Miroslav Tankosić (born 28 September 1978) is a Serbian football goalkeeper. Tankosić also holds the trainer license, and works as a goalkeeper coach in the club.

Club career
Born in Bačka Palanka, Tankosić started his career with the local club Sintelon. Later he played with Vojvodina Tovariševo and Bačka. In summer 2004, Tankosić joined Serbian First League side Spartak Subotica, which was the first club outside he played for outside the municipality of Bačka Palanka. After two seasons playing with the club, Tankosić moved to ČSK Čelarevo in 2006. For the first four seasons with the club, Tankosić was mostly used as a back-up choice. He became the first goalkeeper in the 2010–11 season, when the club relegated in the Serbian League Vojvodina. After he played almost 150 Serbian League Vojvodina matches between 2010 and 2015, Tankosić won the league along with the club a made a promotion to the Serbian First League in summer 2015. Later same year, he also won the Vojvodina region cup with ČSK Čelarevo. Tankosić was awarded for the best goalkeeper of the 2015–16 Serbian First League season by Serbian media Sportski žurnal.

Career statistics

Honours
ČSK Čelarevo
Serbian League Vojvodina: 2014–15

Notes and references

External links
 

1978 births
Living people
People from Bačka Palanka
Association football goalkeepers
Serbian footballers
OFK Bačka players
FK Spartak Subotica players
FK ČSK Čelarevo players
Serbian First League players